is a Japanese voice actor. He began acting in 2003 and is affiliated with Aoni Production. He graduated from Momoyama Gakuin University, a private university.

Filmography
Major roles are highlighted in bold.

Television Anime
2003
 Sonic X – Jailer B
 Bobobo-bo Bo-bobo – Kuma
2004
 Mobile Suit Gundam Seed Destiny – Murasame Pilot (Episode 15)
2006
 Marginal Prince – Haruya Kobayashi
2014
 Dragon Collection – Rei
 Inari Kon Kon – Kōji Tanbabashi
 La Corda d'Oro Blue Sky – Wataru Kanō
2019
 One Piece – Charlotte Newji

Web Anime
2014
 Pretty Guardian Sailor Moon Crystal – Motoki Furuhata
2017
 The King of Fighters: Destiny – Andy Bogard

Video Games
2007
 Reijou Tantei Office no Jikenbo – Sou Ibuki
2009
 Samurai Warriors 3 – Takamaru, various
2014
 Samurai Warriors 4 – Kobayakawa Takakage
 2nd Super Robot Wars Original Generation – Ing Egret
2016
 The King of Fighters XIV – Andy Bogard
 Samurai Warriors: Spirit of Sanada – Takeda Katsuyori
 Super Robot Wars Original Generation: The Moon Dwellers – Ing Egret
2018
 The King of Fighters All Star – Andy Bogard
2021
Samurai Warriors 5 – Kobayakawa Takakage, Takeda Katsuyori
2022
 The King of Fighters XV – Andy Bogard

Dubbing Work

Live Action films
 Adventureland – Additional Voices

Tokusatsu
 Ultraman Boy no Urukoro – Ultraman Dyna

References

External links
 
 

1977 births
Living people
Male voice actors from Nara Prefecture
Japanese male video game actors
Japanese male voice actors
21st-century Japanese male actors
Aoni Production voice actors